August Schmidt (9 September 1808 – 13 October 1891) was an Austrian music writer, journalist, association organizer and musician.

Life

Education and career 
Born in Vienna, August Schmidt, son of the musician as well as civil servant Adam August Schmidt (1777-1847), took the school-leaving examination at the Viennese  in 1824. Schmidt, who had already received violin lessons from his father at the age of five, was subsequently trained as a singer by Johann Baptist Henneberg and Ludwig Schwarzböck. In 1828 he began his military service, and in 1834 he was transferred to the national debt register in the position of a cash officer. After he had been promoted there, he retired in 1870.

Activities 
The active musician and composer of Liedern, Waltzs and concert pieces for violin made a name for himself as a music writer, journalist and organiser of associations. August Schmidt played a leading role in the founding of the Vienna Philharmonic. (1842), of the Wiener Männergesang-Verein (1843) and the mixed choir association Wiener Singakademie (1858). Schmidt, who had been publishing poems, stories and travelogues in newspapers and magazines since 1836, founded the "Allgemeine Wiener Musikzeitung" in 1841, which was influential in the development of Viennese musical life, and he was its publisher and editor until 1847. Afterwards he was correspondent of the Süddeutsche Musik-Zeitung from 1852 to 1854 and from 1856 to 1872 music advisor of the Wanderer.

Schmidt published, among other things, his music biographical compilation Denksteine in 1848, Geschichte des Wiener Männergesang-Vereins in 1860 and Monographie des Madrigals in 1890.

His grave is located at the Vienna Central Cemetery.

Honors
In 1839 the philosophical faculty of the Friedrich-Schiller-Universität Jena awarded Schmidt an honorary doctorate (Dr. phil.) in recognition of his services. On 24 February 1840, the same university also awarded Robert Schumann this title.

Work 
 Orpheus. Musikalisches Album, Vienna: Volke 1840–1842 (Orpheus : musikalisches Album on Heinrich Heine Universität)
 Denksteine. Biographien, Vienna 1848 (Numerized)
 Der Wiener Männergesang-Verein. Geschichtliche Darstellung seines Entstehens und Wirkens zur Feier seines fünfundzwanzigjährigen Jubiläums, Vienna 1868 (Numerized)

Bibliography 
 Constantin von Wurzbach: August. In the Biographisches Lexikon des Kaiserthums Oesterreich, 30th part. Kaiserlich-königliche Hof- und Staatsdruckerei, Vienna 1875, 
 
 Walther Killy and Rudolf Vierhaus (ed.): Deutsche Biographische Enzyklopädie. vol. 9, K.G. Saur Verlag GmbH & Co. KG, Munich, 1996 ,

External links 

 Wikisource August Schmidt
 Schmidt, August on Austria Forum Austriaforum
 Kurzartikel zu August Schmidt in Nachlässe in Österreich – Personenlexikon.

Austrian male writers
Austrian journalists
Austrian composers
1808 births
1891 deaths
Writers from Vienna